John Letcher (March 29, 1813January 26, 1884) was an American lawyer, journalist, and politician. He served as a Representative in the United States Congress, was the 34th Governor of Virginia during the American Civil War, and later served in the Virginia General Assembly. He was also active on the Board of Visitors of Virginia Military Institute.

Biography

Early life
John Letcher was born in the town of Lexington in Rockbridge County, Virginia. He attended private rural schools and Randolph-Macon College in Boydton, Virginia (later relocated to Ashland, Virginia). In 1833, he graduated from Washington Academy in Lexington. He studied law, was admitted to the Virginia State Bar, and opened a practice in Lexington in 1839.

Career
Letcher was editor of the (Shenandoah) Valley Star newspaper from 1840 to 1850. He was active in the presidential campaigns of 1840, 1844, and 1848, serving as a Democratic elector in 1848. Although never a true abolitionist, he signed the Ruffner Pamphlet of 1847, which proposed the abolition of slavery in that part of Virginia west of the Blue Ridge Mountains; however, he soon repudiated this antislavery stand. He was a delegate to the Virginia Constitutional Convention of 1850.

He was elected as a Democratic candidate and served as a Representative in the United States Congress from 1851 to 1859. In Congress, he was known as "Honest John" because of his opposition to government extravagance.

American Civil War
John Letcher was elected as Governor of Virginia in 1859, defeating Whig candidate William L. Goggin, and served from 1860–1864.

Letcher was prominent in the organization of the Peace Conference of 1861 that met in Washington, D.C., on February 8, 1861, to devise means to prevent the impending American Civil War. He discouraged secession but actively sustained the ordinance passed by Virginia on April 17, 1861. Despite scheduling a popular vote to determine whether Virginia would declare secession from the United States, ultimately, the actions of the Virginia Secession Convention of 1861 and the state government, especially Letcher, effectively led Virginia to declare secession from the United States. The referendum occurred on May 23, 1861, and Virginia voters overwhelmingly approved the Articles of Secession. Letcher appointed Robert E. Lee, who had just resigned as a colonel in the U.S. Army, as commander in chief of Virginia's army and navy forces on April 22, 1861, at the grade of major general. On April 24, 1861, Virginia and the Confederate States agreed that the Virginia forces would be under the overall direction of Confederate President Jefferson Davis, pending completion of the process of Virginia joining the Confederate States.
 
Colonel John Brown Baldwin defeated Letcher in May 1863 for a seat in the Second Confederate Congress. In 1864, his home in Lexington was burned by Union troops during General David Hunter's raid.

Postwar

After the Civil War, Letcher resumed the practice of law in Lexington. He was elected as a member of the House of Delegates in the Virginia General Assembly 1875–1877. He was a member of the Board of Visitors of the Virginia Military Institute (VMI) 1866–1880 and served as president of the Board for ten years.

He died on January 26, 1884, at the age of 70, and was interred in the Presbyterian Cemetery (now Oak Grove Cemetery) at Lexington, Virginia.

Electoral history
1859 – Letcher was elected Governor of Virginia, defeating American William Leftwich Goggin.

Family
Letcher's son, John Davidson Letcher, was a professor at Oregon State University, serving as acting president from January 1892 to June 1892. His son Greenlee D. Letcher served two terms in the Virginia House of Delegates.
Governor Letcher had a daughter, Lizzie, who married James Harrison, a language professor at Washington and Lee and later head of the Romance and Teutonic Language Department at the University of Virginia after 1895.

References

Books
Boney, F.N. (1966) John Letcher of Virginia; The Story of Virginia’s Civil War Governor. University, Ala.: University of Alabama Press, 1966.
Long, E. B. The Civil War Day by Day: An Almanac, 1861–1865. Garden City, NY: Doubleday, 1971.

Websites
 John Letcher in Union or Secession: Virginians Decide at the Library of Virginia
 John Letcher in Encyclopedia Virginia
 US Congressional Biographies Online website
 Info Please article

External links

 A Guide to the Executive Papers of Governor John Letcher, 1859–1863 at The Library of Virginia

1813 births
1884 deaths
People from Lexington, Virginia
Democratic Party governors of Virginia
People of Virginia in the American Civil War
Virginia lawyers
Randolph–Macon College alumni
Washington and Lee University alumni
Journalists from Virginia
Democratic Party members of the Virginia House of Delegates
Confederate States of America state governors
Democratic Party members of the United States House of Representatives from Virginia
19th-century American newspaper editors
American male journalists
19th-century American politicians
Southern Historical Society